Lacy Lee Dock (January 22, 1896 – December 8, 1963) was an American Negro league second baseman in the 1910s.

A native of Lexington, Virginia, Dock played for the Dayton Marcos in 1918 and 1919. In 10 recorded career games, he posted four hits in 36 plate appearances. Dock died in Dayton, Ohio in 1963 at age 67.

References

External links
Baseball statistics and player information from Baseball-Reference Black Baseball Stats and Seamheads

1896 births
1963 deaths
Dayton Marcos players
Baseball second basemen
Baseball players from Virginia
People from Lexington, Virginia
20th-century African-American sportspeople